Syed Aqil Shah (born 13 February 1950), is a Pakistani politician, president of the Khyber Pakhtunkhwa Olympic Association, and the former president of Pakistan Wrestling Federation, provincial minister for sports, tourism and culture who represented Provincial Assembly of Khyber Pakhtunkhwa from PK-4 (Swat-III) constituency. Aqil served twice as state minister after contesting assembly elections of Khyber Pakhtunkhwa in 2008 and later the 2013 Khyber Pakhtunkhwa provincial election. Aqil twice served as member of Peshawar Cantonment, the senate, and provincial secretary for information.

He also served as president of the North-West Frontier Province (NWFP) Olympic Association, and later he was appointed as vice-president of the National Olympic Committee of Pakistan. As a president of Pakistan Wrestling Federation (PWF), he represented the country at multi-sport events held at domestic and international level, including the Seoul Olympics.

Life and background
Aqil was born to a political family on 13 February 1950. He received his initial education at Burn Hall, Abbottabad, and later attended Cadet College Hasan Abdal, and Government College at Lahore (now Government College University, Lahore). In 1968, he attended the University of the Punjab where he graduated. He later established his political associations with the Awami National Party and became one of its members.

Controversies
Aqil was charged in 2013 by the High Court of Peshawar over submitting an illegitimate academic degree to the election commission which according to a filed-formal legal document was possibly issued by a diploma mill institute not registered with the Higher Education Commission either. The tribal court's judgement, later withdrawn, sentenced him to one year in prison with a fine of PKR3,000. The case was subsequently dismissed by the court upon an appeal made by Aqil and he was released on bail.

References

Army Burn Hall College alumni
Government College University, Lahore alumni
Provincial ministers of Khyber Pakhtunkhwa
1950 births
Cadet College Hasan Abdal alumni
University of the Punjab alumni
Members of the Provincial Assembly of Khyber Pakhtunkhwa
Living people